Matthew Moralee (21 February 1912−1991) was an English footballer who played as an inside forward in the Football League between the wars.

Born in Barnburgh, near Doncaster, he played for Ormsby United before going to Denaby United, Gainsborough Trinity and Grimsby Town.

Moralee arrived at Division 1 side Aston Villa in October 1936 where he played in 12 games scoring one goal.

In November 1937, he moved to Leicester City who had just been promoted to Division 1. Scoring 6 goals, he played in 43 league and cup matches for them before the outbreak of the war.

He was the son of The Wednesday and Doncaster Rovers player, also called Matt Moralee.

References

1912 births
1991 deaths
Footballers from Doncaster
English footballers
Association football inside forwards
Denaby United F.C. players
Gainsborough Trinity F.C. players
Grimsby Town F.C. players
Aston Villa F.C. players
Leicester City F.C. players
English Football League players